The bamboo antshrike (Cymbilaimus sanctaemariae) is a species of bird in the family Thamnophilidae. It is found in Bolivia, Brazil, and Peru. Its natural habitat is subtropical or tropical moist lowland forests.

References

bamboo antshrike
Birds of the Bolivian Amazon
Birds of the Peruvian Amazon
bamboo antshrike
Taxonomy articles created by Polbot